Emil Mangelsdorff (11 April 1925 – 20 January 2022) was a German jazz musician who played alto saxophone, soprano saxophone, clarinet and flute. He was a jazz pioneer under the Nazi regime which led to his imprisonment. After World War II and years as a prisoner of war, he was a founding member of the jazz ensemble of Hessischer Rundfunk in 1958. He played with several groups and was active, also as an educator, until old age.

Life and career
Mangelsdorff was born in Frankfurt, as the son of the bookbinder Emil Albert Joseph Mangelsdorff (1891–1963), born in Ingolstadt, and his wife Luise, née Becker (1896–1976), from Wertheim. Mangelsdorff was introduced to jazz at age nine, when his mother switched to Radio Luxemburg, and he heard the voice of Louis Armstrong. His first instrument was accordion. In 1942 and 1943, Mangelsdorff studied clarinet at the Hoch Conservatory in Frankfurt. As a member of the Frankfurt , with trumpeter , bassist Hans Otto Jung and drummer , he performed jazz and became a figurehead for Swing Youth, which led to his being imprisoned by the Gestapo. He was forced into the German army and was a Russian prisoner of war for four years. In 1949, he returned to Frankfurt and decided to become a professional jazz musician. He played in the groups of Joe Klimm and Jutta Hipp, and was also a member of the Frankfurt All Stars and of the jazz ensemble of the broadcaster Hessischer Rundfunk from 1958. In 1966, he founded Swinging Oil Drops, with Joki Freund, Volker Kriegel,  and Günter Lenz.

Mangelsdorff was influenced by swing. He continued to develop musically, playing bebop, fusion and cool. In 1964, Mangelsdorff wrote an instruction manual for jazz saxophone. He played with Charles Mingus in New York and performed often in the Jazzkeller (jazz cellar) in Kleine Bockenheimer Straße, Frankfurt, sometimes together with his brother, trombonist Albert Mangelsdorff. He gave his last concert in Frankfurt's Holzhausenschlösschen on 1 November 2021. He also informed in schools about the Nazi era as a witness of the time, continuing remembrance work until old age.

His first wife , an operatic soprano, died in 1973. Monique (died 2018) was his second wife. Mangelsdorff died in Frankfurt am Main on 20 January 2022, at the age of 96.

Awards
 1995 
 1995 Goethe Plaque of the City of Frankfurt
 2001 
 2006 Goethe-Plakette of Hesse
 2008 Officer's Cross of the Order of Merit of the Federal Republic of Germany
 2015 Honorary professorship of the state of Hesse

References

Further reading
 , Karl Heinz Holler, Christian Pfarr: . 5th edition, Reclam, Stuttgart 2000, .
 Ian Carr, Digby Fairweather, Brian Priestley: Rough Guide Jazz. Der ultimative Führer zur Jazzmusik. 1700 Künstler und Bands von den Anfängen bis heute. Metzler, Stuttgart/Weimar 1999, .
 Wolf Kampmann (ed.), with Ekkehard Jost: Reclams Jazzlexikon. Reclam, Stuttgart 2003, .
 Michael H. Kater, Different Drummers: Jazz in the Culture of Nazi Germany, Oxford 2003, 
 Martin Kunzler: Jazz-Lexikon. vol. 2: M–Z (= rororo-Sachbuch. vol. 16513). 2nd edition. Rowohlt, Reinbek bei Hamburg 2004, .

External links

 

1925 births
2022 deaths
21st-century clarinetists
21st-century German male musicians
21st-century saxophonists
Swing clarinetists
Post-bop flautists
Post-bop saxophonists
German jazz saxophonists
Male saxophonists
Hoch Conservatory alumni
Officers Crosses of the Order of Merit of the Federal Republic of Germany
German jazz clarinetists
German jazz flautists
German male jazz musicians
Musicians from Frankfurt
German Army personnel of World War II
German prisoners of war in World War II held by the Soviet Union
20th-century saxophonists
20th-century flautists
21st-century flautists